The 2012 Parramatta Eels season is the 66th in the club's history. Coached by Stephen Kearney (who was replaced part-way through the season by assistant coach, Brad Arthur) and captained by Nathan Hindmarsh, they competed in the NRL's 2012 Telstra Premiership. Parramatta finished the regular season in last place for the first time since 1972, also failing to make the finals for the third consecutive year.

Summary
2012 saw the retirement of Eels legends Luke Burt and Nathan Hindmarsh. It would also mark the first time since 1972 that the team would succumb to the dreaded Wooden Spoon. Parramatta struggled all year, securing just their first win of the season in Round 5 against defending premiers Manly-Warringah Sea Eagles before ending a six-game losing streak against the Cronulla-Sutherland Sharks. This horror start to the season, and a win rate of less than 25% over almost two seasons with the club, coach Stephen Kearney was forced to resign and assistant coach Brad Arthur would become caretaker. The team responded to this producing three wins from four games, including competition front-runners Melbourne Storm and Brisbane Broncos to give the fans some hope for the rest of the season. However this was short lived and following a 38-6 thumping to the South Sydney Rabbitohs in round 25 of the Telstra Premiership were officially unable to avoid the wooden spoon.

Whilst Parramatta's problems were largely attributed to their relatively poor defence, numerous pundits claimed Parramatta's problems in 2012 were largely credited to the recurring absences of star fullback Jarryd Hayne. Even whilst producing higher per-match statistics than any other fullback in the game (eight tries, 14 try-assists), Hayne only managed to complete ten games from the season's 24, due to both injury and State of Origin duty.

Throughout the season many of the Parramatta players came under scrutiny and were dropped to the NSW Cup, including high-profile recruit Chris Sandow, who at the time was touted as overweight and unfit, and veteran Luke Burt. As a result, players Matt Ryan, Jake Mullaney and Nathan Smith were called up to the top squad and have impressed in their roles of Second-Row, Fullback and Hooker respectively, making a suitable replacement for injured stars Jarryd Hayne and Matt Keating.

Towards the end of the season Ricky Stuart was announced as the new coach for the Parramatta Eels from 2013.

Standings

National Rugby League

National Youth Competition

Fixtures

Pre-season

Home and away season

Players and staff

Transfers
In:

Out

Retirees
 Chris Hicks
 Chris Walker
 Paul Whatuira
 Carl Webb

Note: Former Manly player and NSW representative, William Hopoate will join the Eels in 2014 after completing a two-year religious mission for the Church of Jesus Christ of Latter-day Saints.

Player statistics 
Player statistics as of 26 August 2012.

Milestones
 Round 4 — Four losses marked the Eels' worst season opening since 1991
 Round 5 — The Eels broke their losing streak in to 2011 Premiers, the Manly-Warringah Sea Eagles
Part-way through the season it was announced that head coach Stephen Kearney would depart the club, with his assistant Brad Arthur taking over for the remainder of 2012. About a week later Ricky Stuart was announced as the Eels' head coach for the 2013 NRL season.

Jersey and Sponsors
Parramatta retain Pirtek Fluid Systems as major sponsor in 2012. The team is often referred to as the Pirtek Eels. Apparel sponsors for 2012 are Law Partners Compensation Lawyers, the University of New England, and Capital Corporation.

References 

Parramatta Eels seasons
Parramatta Eels season